The UAZ Simbir (Russian: Симбир for Leopard), or UAZ-3162, is a model of off-road vehicle produced at the Russian Ulyanovsk Automobile Plant in 2000–2005. This car is a completely new model in relation to the UAZ-469 and modifications based on it. Is essentially a rebodied extended wheelbase UAZ-3160.  On August 5, 1997 the first prototype of the UAZ-3160 rolled off the assembly line. April 27, 2000 saw the first production sample UAZ-3162 "Simbir" featuring a long wheelbase and new Spicer axles from the UAZ-3160.

In 2003 the car was awarded zero stars out of a possible four by the Russian ARCAP safety assessment program.

The Simbir-based UAZ-2360 pickup truck was produced in small numbers in 2004–2005. The payload was approximately 1000 kg.

The Simbir was in production until 2004.

Description
Body Type: 5 door wagon (4-5 seats.)
Layout: permanent all-wheel drive
Configuration: 4 × 4
Engine: ЗМЗ (ZMZ)-409.10 gasoline
Mass and dimensions
Length: 4630 mm
Width: 2020 mm
Height: 1950 mm
Ground clearance: 210 mm
Wheelbase: 2760 mm
Rear track: 1445 mm
Front track: 1445 mm
Weight: 2040 kg
Load capacity: 800 kg
Fuel consumption: 10.4 at 90 km / h

References

Sport utility vehicles
ARCAP large off-road
2000s cars
UAZ
Cars of Russia